Nathu Khan (1920  1971; sometimes spelled as Nathoo), was a Pakistani sarangi player known for introducing solo sarangi playing tradition with difficult phrases. He was associated with Radio Pakistan and Pakistan Television Corporation. He was also associated with All India Radio before emigrating from India.

Biography 
Nathoo Khan was born in Amritsar, British India. His father Baba Balle was a tabla player. Following the partition of India, he migrated to Pakistan where he became a staff artist at Radio Pakistan.

His uncle Feroze Din was one of his sarangi teachers. He first appearance in a sarangi playing performance was at Kaliyar Sharif where he played Raag Shudh Sarang, a Hindustani classical music raag.

He was introduced to Radio Pakistan, Karachi by its then Managing Director Zulfiqar Ali Bukhari. He later worked at the 'Pakistan International Airlines Arts Academy'. During his career at Radio Pakistan, his composed music for films and radio plays.

According to a major newspaper of Pakistan:

"He was also a great accompanist and accompanied almost all the great vocalists of his time like Ustad Ashiq Ali Khan, Bade Ghulam Ali Khan, Salamat Ali Nazakat Ali, Roshanara Begum. 
According to Ustad Salamat Ali Khan, he was the best accompanist he ever sang with; Ram Narayan being the second best".

Awards 
Nathoo Khan was posthumously awarded the Pride of Performance award in 2016 by the government of Pakistan in recognition of his contribution to classical music and Sindhi music.

Death
Nathoo Khan died in 1971 after a short illness while on a tour of Europe.

Further reading

References

External links
Nathu Khan on sarangi.info website

1920 births
1971 deaths
Pakistani male composers
Muhajir people
Sarangi players
Recipients of the Pride of Performance